"Jag blir hellre jagad av vargar" is a song written and recorded by Orup, peaking at second position at the Swedish singles chart.

The song charted for four weeks at Trackslistan between 19 September-17 October 1987, peaking at 6th position. It also charted at  Svensktoppen for 11 weeks between 18 October 1987-3 January 1988, peaking at second position.

Charts

References

External links 

 

1987 songs
1987 singles
Orup songs
Songs written by Orup
Swedish-language songs